Crenicichla tigrina is a species of cichlid. It is native to the Amazon River in Brazil.

References

tigrina
Fish of the Amazon basin
Freshwater fish of Brazil
Endemic fauna of Brazil
Taxa named by Alex Ploeg
Fish described in 1991